The Vestel Karayel is a surveillance, reconnaissance and later combat unmanned aerial vehicle system developed by Lentatek. The drone is currently operated by Turkish Armed Forces and the Armed Forces of Saudi Arabia.

Design
The Karayel is designed and manufactured in accordance with NATO ‘Airworthiness’ standard; STANAG 4671. The Karayel system has novel triple redundant distributed avionics architecture which ensures protection against all kinds of uncontrolled crash. With this feature, systematic fault safety used only in manned aviation around the world until now, has been carried to an unmanned aerial vehicle for the first time with the Karayel. The aerial vehicle has the ability to protect against lightning thanks to the aluminum network grid on its composite structure. A de-Icing system automatically detects icing conditions allows operations in cold climates. The Karayel, which is an aerial reconnaissance and surveillance platform, can perform target marking, lighting and ammunition direction by its laser sensors and day/night target detection and identification by its camera system which it carries as payload.

Specifications

Karayel-SU TUAV 
Karayel-SU (SU; standing for Armed-Extended Wing) has a longer wingspan, as well as end-plates on its wing tips and two hardpoints for payload under each wing. Each one of the hardpoints can carry 30 kg, meaning that the total payload capacity of the Karayel-SU under its wings is 120 kg. The wing hardpoints can also be equipped with payloads other than munitions. The Karayel-SU also retains the ability to carry 50 kg EO/IR payload at the fuselage payload bay

Technicial Specifications 

 Engine Power 1 × 97 HP (Sea Level)
 Maximum Takeoff Weight :  630 kg
 Wing Span : 13 m
 Total Length :  6.5 m
 Height : 2.11 m
 Wing Useful Load : 120 kg
 Trunk Payload : 50 kg
 Flight Speed : 60-80 knots
 Rate of Climb : 800 m/min
 Operational Altitude 18.000 ft
 Data Link Range:  >150 km
 Landing Distance  : <750 m
 Airborne Time : 20 hours without ammunition, 12 hours with 60 kg load and  8 hours with 120 kg loaded
 Navigation :  Fully Autonomous or Manual, Day Camera (color) & IR Night Camera
 Useful Load : Laser Range Finder, Laser Pointer & Laser Target Marker
 Other Features : Triple redundant avionic architecture, fully autonomous take-off / flight / landing, Composite main structure.

Other variants 
CTech SATCOM On-The-Move terminals for unmanned aerial vehicles

 DEV-KU-18 SATCOM On The Move Terminal mounted Vestel Karayel 
 DEV-KA-12 SATCOM  On The Move Terminal mounted Vestel Karayel

Armaments 

 L-UMTAS (Long Range Anti tank Missile System)
 MAM: MAM-C and MAM-L precision-guided munitions
 Roketsan Cirit (70 mm Missile System)
 TUBITAK-SAGE Bozok Laser Guided Rockets
 TUBITAK-SAGE TOGAN - Air-to-surface launched 81 mm mortar munition

Operators 

  - 6 Karayel UAVs in use, with another 40 to be deployed since 2021 in a timeframe of 5 years for the Saudi Armed forces.
  - 10 Karayel-SU-TUAV-SOTM.

Possible sales 

 - The drone was tested at the Pápa Air Base on 2021 November 4.  There are also plans to produce a variant of the drone in Békéscsaba in a joint German-Turkish-Hungarian operation.
 - Kosovo Security Forces have in plan to buy 3 drone Karayel by 2023 (Government-to-Government (G2G) Procurement / donation with Turkish Ministry of Defense MoD / Turkey’s Military Financial Cooperation Agreement. Incl.  3× KARAYEL-SU AUV; 100× MAM-L anti tank missile; 100× MAM-C laser guided missile; 1× Ground Data Terminals (GDT); 1× Ground Control Stations (GCS); tools and test equipment, spare and repair parts, publications and technical documentation, personnel training, Turkish Government and contractor technical support services, and logistics support.The overall contract value is approximately 25.000.000 €).

Operational history 
 On 31 December 2019, during the Saudi led intervention in Yemen, Houthis fighters announced their forces shot down Saudi drones, one in Razih district in Saada and another in the Red Sea port city of Hodeidah. Later the Houthis published footage of the downing and recovery of the remains of a Vestel Karayel drone from the Red Sea.
 On 6 January 2021, during the Saudi led intervention in Yemen, Houthi forces shot down a Vestel Karayel drone in al-Mahashimah, Al-Jawf province.
 On 7 March 2021, another Vestel Karayel drone is shot down in al-Maraziq, Al-Jawf province by Houthi air defenses. Later publishing footage of the wreckage of the drone.
 On 21 May 2022, one Vestel Karayel drone was shot down by Houthi fighters in Hajjah governorate. Later Houthis released footage of the drone wreck.

See also

 List of unmanned aerial vehicles#Turkey
 Bayraktar TB2
 TAI Anka

References

External links 
  Lentatek Company Website

International unmanned aerial vehicles
Unmanned military aircraft of Turkey
Medium-altitude long-endurance unmanned aerial vehicles